The 34th Lambda Literary Awards were announced on June 11, 2022 to honour works of LGBT literature published in 2021.

Nominees were announced in March 2022.

Special awards

Nominees and winners

References 

2022 in LGBT history
Lambda Literary Awards
Lists of LGBT-related award winners and nominees
Lambda
Lambda